The  Pitcairn PA-4 Fleetwing II, also called the Pitcairn Fleetwing DeLuxe, and the Pitcairn PA-4 Fleetwing is a commercial mail hauling and passenger biplane.

Design and development
Ten PA-4s were built before it was re-engined with the Wright J-5 Whirlwind as the Pitcairn PA-5 to fly on the CAM-19 mail routes.

The Fleetwing II is a conventional landing gear equipped biplane with strut-braced tail surfaces. The fuselage is welded steel-tube construction with aircraft fabric covering. The cowling is formed from two pieces. The wire wheels were streamlined with laced-on discs.

Operational history
Six Fleetwings were sold directly to Pitcairn Aviation. In 1928, the Fleetwing II The City of Reading participated in the Transcontinental Air Race. It was sold to Reading Airways after the race and later used in stunt flying around Cumberland, Maryland with the signature "Flying through a train tunnel" illusion.

The sole remaining Fleetwing II was rebuilt over the course of seven years by Harold Armstrong from drawings supplied by Steve Pitcairn (1925-2008), son of company founder Harold Frederick Pitcairn (1897-1960). The aircraft won Grand Champion Antique at the 1991 EAA AirVenture Oshkosh airshow.   Armstrong's Fleetwing was seriously damaged in an accident on September 9, 2012.

Specifications (Fleetwing II)

References

Citations

Bibliography

External links

Pitcairn aircraft
Biplanes
Single-engined tractor aircraft
Aircraft first flown in 1927